The  413th Flight Test Group (413 FTG) is a United States Air Force Air Force Reserve Command unit. It is stationed at Robins Air Force Base, Georgia as a tenant unit.

The 413 FTG conducts flight tests on aircraft after the programmed depot maintenance is completed. Its history goes back to 1944 when the 413th Fighter Group flew very long range (VLR) escort missions of Twentieth Air Force B-29 Superfortress bombardment groups against Japan. During the Cold War, the unit was a Strategic Air Command fighter-escort wing and later Tactical Air Command tactical fighter group in the 1950s.

Today, the group's units are stationed throughout the United States to help conduct functional flight tests. The group is a partnership between the Air Force Materiel Command and the Air Force Reserve Command and is the operational supervisor of all the depot flight test units. The group manages five squadrons and two flights is made up of 140 full-time Airmen, 78 traditional reservist and nine civil servants. Once PDM is completed, members of the flight crew begin a variety of ground checks to make sure the aircraft is ready for a functional test flight. Once the aircraft is deemed airworthy, then the airplane is delivered to the home station and is configured to fly whatever mission it is assigned to fly.

Assigned units and aircraft flown
10th Flight Test Squadron (Tinker AFB, OK) B-1, B-52, E-3, KC-135, RC-135, KC-46
313th Flight Test Flight (Lackland AFB, TX) KC-135, C-17 (2001–2013)
339th Flight Test Squadron (Robins AFB, GA) C-5, C-130, F-15
370th Flight Test Squadron (Edwards AFB, CA) C-12, KC-10, KC-135
415th Flight Test Flight (Randolph AFB, TX) T-38, T-6
514th Flight Test Squadron (Hill AFB, UT) A-10, F-16, F-22, F-35, C-130
413th Force Support Flight (Robins AFB, GA)
413th Aeromedical Staging Squadron (Robins AFB, GA)

History

World War II
The unit served primarily in the Pacific Ocean theater of World War II as part of Twentieth Air Force. The 413th Fighter Group's aircraft flew very long range (VLR) escort missions of B-29 Superfortress bombardment groups against Japan.

Constituted as 413th Fighter Group on 5 October 1944 and activated on 15 October. Trained for very-long-range operations with P-47N Thunderbolts.

Moved to the South West Pacific Area, April–June 1945. The group was assigned to the Twentieth Air Force VII Fighter Command, 301st Fighter Wing. Was reassigned to the Seventh Air Force early in August 1945. Flew a few strafing missions from Saipan to the Truk Islands in May before beginning operations from Ie Shima in June. Engaged in dive-bombing and strafing attacks on factories, radar stations, airfields, small ships, and other targets in Japan. Made several attacks on shipping and airfields in China during July. Flew its only escort mission on 8 August 1945 when it covered B-29's during a raid against Yawata, Kyoto, Japan.

Cold War
Served as a part of the air defense and occupation force for the Ryukyu Islands after the war. Inactivated on Okinawa on 15 October 1946.

Activated as part of Tactical Air Command in 1954. Trained to achieve and maintain combat readiness by participation in tactical exercises, firepower demonstrations, joint training with US Army and US Marine Corps units, and tactical evaluations. Provided augmentation of Sixteenth Air Force in Spain, through deployment of assigned squadrons on a rotational basis, 1958–1959.

Lineage
 Established as 413th Fighter Group, Single Engine on 5 October 1944
 Activated on 15 October 1944
 Inactivated on 15 October 1946
 Redesignated 413th Fighter-Day Group on 27 October 1954
 Activated on 11 November 1954
 Inactivated on 8 October 1957
 Consolidated (31 January 1984) with the 413th Strategic Fighter Wing, which was established on 23 March 1953.
 Redesignated 413th Fighter-Day Wing on 26 September 1957
 Activated on 8 October 1957
 Redesignated 413th Tactical Fighter Wing on 1 July 1958
 Inactivated on 15 March 1959
 Redesignated 413th Flight Test Group on 18 July 2003
 Activated in the Reserve on 1 October 2003.

Assignments

 First Air Force, 15 October 1944
 301st Fighter Wing, 2 November 1944 – 15 October 1946
 Ninth Air Force, 11 November 1954
 Attached to 479th Fighter-Day Wing, 11 November 1954 – 7 October 1957

 Eighteenth Air Force, 1 October 1957
 831st Air Division, 8 October 1957 – 15 March 1959
 Twenty-Second Air Force, 1 October 2003–present

Components
 1st Fighter (later, 1st Fighter-Day; 1st Tactical Fighter) Squadron: 15 October 1944 – 15 October 1946; 11 November 1954 – 15 March 1959 (detached 27 June – c. 12 November 1958)
 10th Flight Test Squadron: 1 October 2003–present
 21st Fighter (later, 21st Fighter-Day; 21st Tactical Fighter) Squadron: 15 October 1944 – 15 October 1946; 11 November 1954 – 15 March 1959 (detached 14–15 March 1959)
 34th Fighter (later 34th Fighter-Day; 34th Tactical Fighter) Squadron: 15 October 1944 – 15 October 1946; 11 November 1954 – 15 March 1959
 339th Flight Test Squadron: 1 October 2003–present
 370th Flight Test Squadron: 1 October 2003–present
 474th Fighter-Day Squadron (later, 474th Tactical Fighter Squadron): 8 October 1957 – 15 March 1959 (detached 11 November 1958 – 15 March 1959)
 514th Flight Test Squadron: 1 October 2003–present
 413th Aeromedical Staging Squadron

Flights
 313th Flight Test Flight: 1 October 2003 – 2013
 415th Flight Test Flight: 1 October 2003–present
 420th Flight Test Flight: 1 October 2003 – 1 September 2007
 413th Force Support Flight:

Stations

 Seymour-Johnson Field, NC 15 October 1944
 Bluethenthal Field, NC November 1944 – 6 April 1945
 Ie Shima Airfield, Okinawa, 19 May 1945
 Kadena Field, Okinawa 10 November 1945

 Yontan Airfield, Okinawa, 29 January – October 1946
 George Air Force Base, California, 11 November 1954 – 15 March 1959
 Robins Air Force Base, Georgia, 1 October 2003–present

Aircraft Assigned
 P-47 Thunderbolt 1944–1946
 F-86 Sabre, 1954–1956
 F-100 Super Sabre, 1955–1959

References

 
 
 
  Robins AFB press release about 413th Flight Test Group

External links
 413th Fighter Group Website

Military units and formations of the United States Air Force Reserves